A list of American films released in 1964.

My Fair Lady won the Academy Award for Best Picture.



A-C and 0-9

D-F

G-H

I-K

L-Q

R-V

W-Z

See also

 1964 in the United States

References

External links

1964 films at the Internet Movie Database
List of 1964 box office number-one films in the United States

1964
Films
Lists of 1964 films by country or language